Juan Almario (English: John Almary; Latin: Ioannes Almarius; born Elvis Mitra Calampiano) is the second and current Patriarch of the Apostolic Catholic Church.

He was consecrated as Patriarch through ceremonies held on 31 January 2021. Before his appointment as head of the church, he served as long-time senior archbishop and chancellor to the Patriarch at the National Shrine of Ina Poon Bato in Quezon City, Philippines.

References

Year of birth missing (living people)
Filipino Christian religious leaders
Living people